Adelgunde Vogt (July 17, 1811 – June 10, 1892) was a Danish sculptor. She was the first female sculptor in Denmark. She is most known for her sculptures of animals in ivory and bronze, but she also made portrait busts.

Biography
Emilie Adelgunde Vogt was the daughter of Michael Johan Christian Herbst (1775–1830) and Michelle Elisabeth Christiance Charlotte Stibolt (1788–1861). Her father was a Commissioner General and the director of the military garment factory. She spent her youth in Sorø and Slagelse. After the death of her father, the family moved to Copenhagen in 1837.

She first received instruction in modeling from sculptor student Johan Peter Heldt. She was a student of Hermann Ernst Freund in 1837. From 1838 she began to exhibit. She trained in the studio of Bertel Thorvaldsen in 1840. She was proposed to be inducted into the Royal Danish Academy of Fine Arts in 1843, but as women were not allowed to be members, she was instead made an honorary member. In 1839, she was awarded the Neuhausen Prize. In 1844, she received a travel allowance and went to study in Italy.

She was married to chargé d’affaires Frederik Siegfried Vogt (1777–1855) in 1846. In later life, she exhibited at the Charlottenborg Spring Exhibition between 1860-72. She died in Copenhagen and was buried in Assistens Cemetery.

Selected works
En ko med diende kalv (1839) Funen's Art Museum
En kronhjort med hind og kalv (1842) Vemmetofte 
En bjørn (1862) Gammel Estrup Manor
To stående heste (1863) National Gallery of Denmark

References

1811 births
1892 deaths
19th-century Danish sculptors
19th-century Danish women artists
Danish women sculptors